Zadniye Chudi is a rural locality (a village) in Nikolo-Ramenskoye Rural Settlement, Cherepovetsky District, Vologda Oblast, Russia. The population was 25 as of 2002.

Geography 
Zadniye Chudi is located 89 km southwest of Cherepovets (the district's administrative centre) by road. Yagnitsa is the nearest rural locality.

References 

Rural localities in Cherepovetsky District